Katherine Speer Reed (July 1, 1881 – July 1, 1922) was an American screenwriter and playwright active during Hollywood's silent era. She was also a journalist active in the women's suffrage movement.

Biography 
Katherine was born in Washington, Pennsylvania, to Presbyterian minister William Reed and his wife, Margaret McKnight. She graduated from Bryn Mawr College in her early 20s and started off her career working in advertising.

By the early 1910s, she was employed as a journalist and was active in the fight to get women the right to vote. She traveled the country organizing conventions, publishing stories, and serving as executive secretary of the Pennsylvania Women's Suffrage Association.

During the late 1910s and early 1920s, she wrote more than two dozen scenarios for early silent pictures produced for the Vitagraph and Selznick companies. Titles included Lorna Doone, Greater Than Fame, and Let's Elope.

She died on July 1, 1922, at her brother's home on Long Island, after an illness of about a year.

Selected filmography 
 Lorna Doone (1922)
 Who Am I? (1921)
 The Palace of Darkened Windows (1920)
 The Invisible Divorce (1920)
 Blind Youth (1920)
 Greater Than Fame (1920)
 Just a Wife (1920)
 Nothing But the Truth (1920)
 The Bramble Bush (1919)
 A Girl at Bay (1919)
 Let's Elope (1919)
 The Enchanted Barn (1919)
 The Girl in His House (1918)
 The Enchanted Profile (1918) (short)
 The Business of Life (1918)
 Schools and Schools (1918)
 Seeking an Oversoul (1918) (short)
 The Skylight Room (1917)
 The Renaissance at Charleroi (1917)
 The Indian Summer of Dry Valley Johnson (1917)
 Blind Man's Holiday (1917)
 Bobby's Bravery (1917) (short)
 The Guilty Party (1917) (short)
 No Story (1917)
 The Gold That Glittered (1917) (short)
 A Service of Love (1917) (short)
 The Gift of the Magi (1917) (short)

References

External links 

American women screenwriters
American suffragists
Screenwriters from New York (state)
1881 births
1922 deaths
People from Washington, Pennsylvania
Bryn Mawr College alumni
20th-century American women writers
20th-century American writers
20th-century American screenwriters